3-Methylglutaconic acid is a glutarate which builds up in the urine in 3-methylglutaconic aciduria or 3-hydroxy-3-methylglutaric aciduria.

See also
 Glutaconic acid

References

External links
 2TMS Spectrum

Dicarboxylic acids